In music, changing tones (also called double neighboring tones and neighbor group) consists of two consecutive non-chord tones. The first moves in one direction by a step from a chord tone, then skips by a third in the opposite direction to another non-chord tone, and then finally resolves back to the original chord tone. Changing tones appear to resemble two consecutive neighbor tones; an upper neighbor and a lower neighbor with the chord tone missing from the middle. The changing tone functions as a way to decorate, or embellish, a chord tone and are also used to provide rhythmic interest between common tones.  In rare instances, changing tones can be heard as musical cryptograms, such as the cruciform melody.

References 

Nonchord tones
Ornamentation